Basket News was a weekly French magazine about basketball. In 2008, the magazine merged with Maxi-Basket. On April 3, 2013, after releasing the 643 issue, it was switched to the tabloid format.

External links
 

2000 establishments in France
2008 disestablishments in France
Basketball magazines
Defunct magazines published in France
French-language magazines
Magazines published in Paris
Newspapers published in Paris
Magazines established in 2000
Magazines disestablished in 2008
Newspapers established in 2013
Weekly magazines published in France